was a district located in Shiga Prefecture, Japan.

As of 2003, the district has an estimated population of 21,964 and a density of 306.20 persons per km2. The total area is 71.73 km2.

History
1868 (Boshin War/Meiji Restoration) – The shogunate territories in the district become part of Ōtsu Prefecture (Ōtsu-ken)
1871 (Abolition of the han system) –  All feudal domains (-han), including those containing territories in the district, become prefectures (-ken).
1871/72 – In the first wave of prefectural mergers, the entire district becomes part of Ōtsu Prefecture which is then renamed to Shiga after the district
1878/79 – The ancient districts of provinces are reactivated as modern administrative units as districts of prefectures: the district government of Shiga is established in Ōtsu-Hashimoto-chō (?, 大津橋本町)

1/4/1889 (establishment of municipalities & Great Meiji mergers) - The "Town and Village Code" (町村制, chō-son-sei), the new law establishing towns and villages as modern political units, was implemented. As a result, the town of Ōtsu and the villages of Shiga (滋賀村, Shiga-mura, "Shiga Village"), Zeze, Ishiyama, Sakamoto, Shimosakamoto, Ogoto, Katata, Ōgi, Mano, Ikadachi, Katsuragawa, Wani, Kido and Komatsu were formed.
1/4/1898 - The "District Code" (郡制, gun-sei), the revised law governing districts, was implemented, establishing indirectly elected district assemblies (gun-kai) and collective executive councils (gun-sanjikai).
1/10/1898 - Ōtsu Town (大津町, Ōtsu-chō) became [by definition of city: district-independent] Ōtsu City (大津市, Ōtsu-shi).
20/7/1901 -
The village of Zeze became the town of Zeze.
The village of Katata became the town of Katata.
1/4/1923 - The district assembly was abolished. The district office remains.
1/7/1926 - The district government was abolished, reducing the district (again) to a geographical division.
1/1/1930 - The village of Ishiyama became the town of Ishiyama.
10/5/1932 - The village of Shiga merged into the city of Ōtsu.
1/4/1951 - The towns of Zeze and Ishiyama merged with the city of Ōtsu into the new city of Ōtsu.
1950s (Great Shōwa mergers)
1/4/1955 - The town of Katata and the villages of Ōgi, Mano, Ikadachi and Katsuragawa merged into the town of Katata.
1/10/1955 - The villages of Wani, Kido and Komatsu merged into Shiga Town (志賀町, Shigachō).
30/9/1956 - Part of the town of Shiga (Kamogawa) merged into the town of Takashima from Takashima District.
1/4/1967 - The village of Katata merged into the city of Ōtsu.
20/3/2006 - The town of Shiga merged into the city of Ōtsu. Shiga District was dissolved as a result of this merger.

Transition
Light blue autonomies are Shiga District's town, deep blue autonomies are Shiga District's village, and gray autonomies are others.

Former districts of Shiga Prefecture